Jonathan Newth (born 6 March 1939) is an English actor.

Early life

Newth trained at the Central School of Speech and Drama.

Career

Newth's theatre work includes appearances with the RSC, in the West End and on Broadway.

His television credits include Emergency Ward 10, The Six Wives of Henry VIII, Ace of Wands, The Troubleshooters, Z-Cars, Callan, Van der Valk, The Brothers, Softly, Softly, Poldark, Doctor Who (Underworld), Notorious Woman, Secret Army (Barsacq), The Professionals, The Nightmare Man, The Day of the Triffids, Tenko (Colonel Clifford Jefferson), Triangle, Angels, Juliet Bravo, After Henry, The Adventures of Sherlock Holmes ("The Bruce-Partington Plans"), Boon, Bugs, The Bill, Agatha Christie's Poirot (Dumb Witness), Peak Practice and Heartbeat.

Personal life
According to an article in 2007, Newth had lived for many years in Bradford-on-Avon with his wife actress Gay Wilde and their four children. They married in 1979.

Partial filmography
Carry On Spying (1964) - Guard (uncredited)
Far from the Madding Crowd (1967) - Gentleman at Cockfight
Yellow Dog (1973) - Tim
Danger on Dartmoor (1980)
North Sea Hijack (1980) - Kirk
Champions (1984) - Mr. Griffith Jones
Missing From Home (1984) - Tony Walters
The Case of Marcel Duchamp (1984)
Incognito (1997) - Judge
The Affair of the Necklace (2001) - Magistrate de Marce
Doctors (2019) - John Webster - 1 episode

References

External links

1939 births
Living people
20th-century English male actors
21st-century English male actors
Alumni of the Royal Central School of Speech and Drama
English male stage actors
English male television actors
Male actors from Devon
Royal Shakespeare Company members
People from Bradford-on-Avon